Andrew D. Morgan (December 1859 – December 15, 1934) was a lawyer and president of Ilion, New York, and chairman of the New York State Hospital Commission from March 27, 1914, to April 21, 1921.

Biography
He was born in December 1859 to Mary J. Morgan who was a widow by the year 1900. He had a sister named Mina Morgan. Andrew married Ann and had a son, Miles Morgan He died on December 15, 1934.

References

1859 births
1934 deaths
People from Ilion, New York
New York State Hospital Commission